Larry Ferrari (March 4, 1932 – November 20, 1997), born Lazarus Louis Ferrari, was an American organist who hosted The Larry Ferrari Show from 1954 to 1997 on WPVI-TV in Philadelphia, a weekly Sunday morning half-hour program of organ music.

Biography
Born in Boston, Massachusetts on March 4, 1932 as Lazarus Louis Ferrari, Larry Ferrari was a son of Colomba Ferrari. He changed his name to "Larry" when a nun suggested he Americanize it. Ferrari studied piano and organ as a boy and started his music career when he began performing at his local church at 11 years old.  Soon after, he began playing at a local skating rink.  According to friends and family, Ferrari did not use sheet music; after hearing a song he could play it from memory.

His career in broadcasting got its start shortly after he joined the United States Army in 1952. It was there, while idly passing the time during leave by playing the organ, that he came to the notice of his commanding officer as a likely person to put on the "Soldier Parade" with Arlene Francis (later of What's My Line? fame). Shortly afterward, Ferrari performed on a number of public service recordings that were distributed coast to coast. An avid amateur radio operator, he held the call of WA2MKI and was heard nearly daily on the air talking to his friends as he drove to and from his home in New Jersey to the television studio.

During the 1960s, he also performed as the organist for Philadelphia's ice hockey team, the Philadelphia Flyers.

The Larry Ferrari Show was seen in the Delaware Valley for 43 years on Sunday mornings. (Its theme music was his instrumental version of "Once In A While.") Ferrari's show lasted longer than any other show on Channel 6, with the exception of Chief Halftown. He was also the Lowrey Organ company's National Concert Artist. He also made cameo appearances as the house "band" on the syndicated Wheel of Fortune during their visit to the former Philadelphia Civic Center in Fall 1992.  He also was the background organist for WPVI produced shows including Chief Halftown and Captain Noah.

The Broadcast Pioneers of Philadelphia posthumously inducted Ferrari into their Hall of Fame in 2000.

Death
Ferrari's last broadcast aired on Sunday, November 30, 1997 at 6:30 am. A resident of Cinnaminson Township, New Jersey, Ferrari died of leukemia at age 65 on November 20, 1997.

Legacy
On November 16, 2000, Ferrari was inducted into the Hall of Fame of the Broadcast Pioneers of Philadelphia. The award was accepted on his behalf by longtime colleague W. Carter Merbreier (Captain Noah and His Magical Ark). Ferrari  provided the music for Captain Noah, Chief Halftown, and Dialing for Dollars. Teaching many classes at Fox Chase elementary school in Philadelphia, Ferrari also helped teach school children music.

Recordings

1. Relax with Larry Ferrari, RCA Victor 1959 LPM-1496 (mono)
2. Reminisce, RCA Victor Living Stereo LSP-1850 (Schwann catalog 1-59)
3. At the Mighty Wurlitzer Pipe Organ-Detroit Senate Theatre
4. Encore-Detroit Senate Wurlitzer
5. Hawaiian Favorites "Especially For You"
6. My Favorite Hymns
7. I Wish You The Merriest (Christmas)
8. Memories
9. Merry Christmas Carols
10. Most Requested T.V. Favorites
Source: Schwann Catalog, April 1960 p. 203

References

1932 births
1997 deaths
American male organists
Deaths from cancer in New Jersey
Deaths from leukemia
Musicians from Philadelphia
People from Cinnaminson Township, New Jersey
20th-century American musicians
American people of Italian descent
20th-century organists
20th-century American male musicians
Amateur radio people
American organists